Curse of the Crimson Altar is a 1968 British horror film directed by Vernon Sewell and starring Christopher Lee, Boris Karloff, Barbara Steele and Mark Eden. The film was produced by Louis M. Heyward for Tigon British Film Productions. The film was edited and released as The Crimson Cult in the United States. The screenplay, by Doctor Who writers Mervyn Haisman and Henry Lincoln, was based (uncredited) on the short story "The Dreams in the Witch House" by H. P. Lovecraft. This film also featured the final British film appearance of horror icon Karloff.

The film opened in England in December 1968, then later premiered in Los Angeles on April 15, 1970 on a double bill with Horror House starring Frankie Avalon. It later went into general release across the United States on Nov. 11, 1970, on a double bill with Count Yorga, Vampire.

Plot synopsis
Antiques dealer Robert Manning (Eden) searches for his brother, who was last known to have visited the remote house of Craxted Lodge at Greymarsh, their family's ancestral town. Arriving at night, he finds a party is in progress, and he is invited to stay by Eve (Wetherell), the niece of the owner of the house. His sleep is restless and strange dreams of ritual sacrifice disturb him. Enquiring about his brother, Peter, he is assured by the house owner, Morley (Lee), that the man is not there. Manning's suspicions are aroused by nightmarish hallucinations. Occult expert Professor Marsh (Karloff) informs Manning about a witchcraft cult led by Morley's ancestor, Lavinia (Steele). With the vicar's help the cult is discovered to still be active. In an effort to kill both Robert and Eve, the modern and righteous descendant of Lavinia, Morley sets fire to Craxted Lodge but is trapped on the roof. He is actually the head of the cult, the ancestral witch Lavinia, who, laughing at the bystanders, is consumed in the flames.

Cast
Christopher Lee – Morley  
Boris Karloff – Professor John Marsh
Mark Eden – Robert Manning
Barbara Steele – Lavinia Morley
Michael Gough – Elder
Virginia Wetherell – Eve Morley
Rosemarie Reede – Esther
Derek Tansley – Judge
Michael Warren – Chauffeur
Ron Pember – Petrol attendant 
Denys Peek – Peter Manning
Rupert Davies – The Vicar

Production
The house used for Craxted Lodge is Grim's Dyke, the allegedly haunted former home of William S. Gilbert, located in  Old Redding, Harrow Weald, Middlesex, London. The building, which is now a hotel, was used for both exterior and interior shots. Unfortunately, the interiors were in a state of disrepair and needed and extensive refit. Shooting the middle of winter meant that additional fan heaters had to be installed to keep the tempreture in the dressing rooms tolerable for the actors. Christopher Lee reported that, despite Tigon’s best efforts, he spend the whole picture shivering from cold. 

Boris Karloff, who was over eighty and in poor health, was required for two night shoots, filmed at the very end of his involvement- just in case! The actor contracted a mild cold, accordng to producer Tony Tenser, and as precaution spend several days in a private clinic under observation. He was then given a clean bill of health and travelled to Hollywood to make four more films back-to-back. Sadly, he passed away before Curse of the Crimson Cult was released, and Tigon were so nervous that the film would be billed as ‘the film that killed Boris Karloff’ that they released a quote from the actor saying he contracted bronchitis not in England, but in Hollywood.

Critical reception
Roger Greenspun of The New York Times wrote, "Karloff himself, cadaverous and almost wholly crippled, acts with a quiet lucidity of such great beauty that it is a refreshment merely to hear him speak old claptrap. Nothing else in The Crimson Cult comes close to him—though there is Barbara Steele in greenface playing Lavinia, a glamorous 300-year-old and a monumental cast that lists no fewer than seven-party girls, plus several sacrificial virgins." Variety wrote that as one of Karloff's final pictures, "it would have been nice if it had been a better role. As it is, it is a totally unabashed rehash of a formula that Karloff has been identified with through the years." Kevin Thomas of the Los Angeles Times called the film "a delight for horror fans, with Karloff in top form despite the infirmities of age." The Monthly Film Bulletin wrote that apart from a wild party and some exposure of a woman's bosom in a bed, "this is one of the lamest and tamest horrors in a long time, with the script hobbling along like an underprivileged Agatha Christie thriller through acres of would-be sinister dialogue as the handsome hero investigates endlessly and Karloff and Christopher Lee dispense meaningful sneers."

References

External links

1968 films
1968 horror films
British horror films
British supernatural horror films
Films directed by Vernon Sewell
Films set in country houses
1960s English-language films
1960s British films